Catherine Wagner (born 1969 in Rangoon, Burma) is an American poet and academic.

Life
Wagner lived in Asia and the Middle East until 1977, when her family moved to Baltimore, Maryland.
She graduated from University of Tennessee at Chattanooga, University of Iowa (MFA, 1994), and University of Utah (PhD, 2000).

Wagner is the author of Miss America (2001), Macular Hole (2004), My New Job (2009), and Nervous Device (2012).

Her work has appeared in anthologies including The Norton Anthology of Postmodern American Poetry (2012 edition), Poets on Teaching, Starting Today: Poems for Obama’s First 100 Days, Gurlesque, State of the Union: 50 Political Poems, A Best of Fence: The First Nine Years, and The Best American Erotic Poems, 1800 to the Present, Best American Experimental Writing 2015 among others.

She is professor of English at Miami University in Oxford, Ohio.

Awards
 Ruth Lilly Poetry Fellowship (1990)
 Teaching-Writing Fellowship, University of Iowa, 1992-1994
 Steffensen Cannon Fellowship, University of Utah, 1997-1999

Works

Poetry
Of Course. New York: Fence Books, 2020. 
Nervous Device. San Francisco: City Lights Publishers, 2012. 
My New Job. New York: Fence Books, 2009. 
Macular Hole. New York: Fence Books, 2004. 
Miss America. New York: Fence Books, 2001.

Chapbooks
 Bornt. Miniature handmade chapbook. Schaffhausen, Switzerland: Dusie Press, 2009.
 Articulate How. Washington, DC: Big Game Books, 2008.
 Hole in the Ground. Oxford, OH: Slack Buddha Press, 2008.
 Everyone in the Room is a Representative of the World at Large. Letterpress. Fort Collins, CO: Bonfire Press, 2007.
 Imitating. Nottingham, England: Leafe Press, 2004.
 Exercises. New York: 811 Books, 2004.
 Hotel Faust. Sheffield/Cheltenham, England: West House Books/Gratton Street Irregulars, 2001.
 Boxes. Los Angeles: Seeing Eye Books (now Mindmade Books, 2001).
 Fraction Anthems. New York: 811 Books, 1999.

Criticism
"I Am a Poet and I Have," essay on academic labor and poetry, Poetic Labor Project, July 2012
"Revision", Evening May Come, Issue 9, September 2011
Selection of and commentary on previously unpublished poems by Barbara Guest, Chicago Review Barbara Guest issue
Review of Harryette Mullen’s Recyclopedia, Chicago Review, Winter 2007

Editing

References

External links
Catherine Wagner PennSound page
Three poems, Lana Turner, Fall 2012
Two poems, Claudius App, March 2012
The Conversant, "Virginia Konchan with Cathy Wagner," interview, April 2013
Cross-Cultural Poetics interview with Leonard Schwartz, February 21, 2013
"An Interview with Catherine Wagner", Bookslut, June 2007
Archive of the Now page
Reading at Contemporary Women’s Experimental Poetry Festival, Cambridge 2006
"My What to Replace My"; "Who Admitted You?"; "An Hendy Hap"; "There Was a Place in the Brain, a Red Knot"; "The Divinity of Man", Boston Review, December 2001/January 2002 
Delirious Hem/Dusie Delirious Adventskalendar, December 2009
Catherine Wagner's City Lights Author's page

Poets from Maryland
University of Tennessee at Chattanooga alumni
University of Iowa alumni
University of Utah alumni
Miami University faculty
Living people
1969 births
American women poets
21st-century American poets
American women academics
21st-century American women writers